David Letourneau (born April 18, 1989) is a professional squash player who represents Canada. He reached a career-high world ranking of World No. 103 in May 2013.

References

External links 
 
 

1989 births
Living people
Canadian male squash players
Sportspeople from Calgary
21st-century Canadian people